Preethi Prema Pranaya is a 2003 Indian Kannada-language drama film written and directed by Kavitha Lankesh. The film features an ensemble cast of Anant Nag, Bharathi Vishnuvardhan, Sudharani, Prakash Raj, Bhavana, Anu Prabhakar and Sunil Raoh. It was produced by "Indo - Hollywood" films, consisting of five producers, namely Mano Murthy, Ram Prasad, Dr. Renuka and Somashekar. The music was composed by Mano Murthy.

The film went on to become a musical hit and won many awards including the National Film Award for Best Feature Film in Kannada.

The film revolved around three generations of two families having Ananth Nag and Bharathi Vishnuvardhan as first generation. The movie was also an inspiration for 2005 Hindi movie Pyaar Mein Twist.

Plot
Family of Dr. Chandrashekhar (Ananthnag) - a widower in his family has a son Dr. Ashok (Prakash Rai) and daughter-in-law Jyothi (Sudharani) and grandson Vivek (Sunil Rao). Second son Ajay (Arun Sagar) too is a doctor with wife Sheela (Bhavana), an ad professional. Well settled doctor has enough name and fame but the concern doted by his sons irritates him. Their over cautious behavior suffocates him. Too much is too bad. He happens to meet Sharadha Devi (Bharathi), a widow, in an accident and as a doctor he does his duty but with an 'extra care'. This leads into friendship and later they could not resist meeting each other with some pretext or the other. He finds the kind of affection, love and care that he needed at his age through this relationship with Sharadha Devi and vis-à-vis. Film takes an enlivening climax when Chandrashekar takes a bold step to face his family member and the society. This demonstrates that every human being needs someone 'who cares for them', 'who listens to them', 'who shares their feelings' no matter what age group you are in.

Cast
 Ananth Nag as Dr Chandrashekhar 
 Prakash Raj as Dr Ashok
 Bharathi Vishnuvardhan as Sharada Devi
 Sudharani as Jyothi
 Bhavana as Sheela
 Sunil Raoh as Vivek
 Anu Prabhakar
 Sampath Raj
 Arun Sagar as Dr Ajay
 Loknath
 Shivaram

Production 
Filming for Preethi Prema Pranaya began in January 2003. The film was produced jointly by four NRIs: composer Mano Murthy, singer Ramprasad, Somashekar and Dr Renuka Ramappa under the banner of Indo-Hollywood Creations. Director Kavitha Lankesh stated that the film would try to substantiate that "love is ageless". She added that, "Having a partner in the old age is not new in the US. This is logically justified as the dear ones including sons and daughters keep away from their own parents. The elders feel left in the lurch especially when they live in far off places without anyone looking after them." Producer Ramprasad stated that the film would delve "into the serious issue of having a partner in life to support after he or she becomes a widower or widow."

Soundtrack
 "Manase Manase" - Suresh Peters, Archana Udupa
 "Ellidde Illi Thanka" - K. S. Chitra, Ram Prasad
 "Kabbina Jalle" - B. Jayashree, Ram Prasad
 "Chapala Chapala" - Ram Prasad, Sham
 "Ondu Maath Keltheeni" - Nanditha, Ram Prasad
 "Preethi Prema Pranaya" - Archana Udupa, Nanditha, Pallavi

Awards
51st National Film Awards
 Best Feature Film in Kannada

2003–04 Karnataka State Film Awards
 Best Screenplay – Kavitha Lankesh
 Best Lyrics - K. Kalyan

South Cine Fans Awards
 Best Music Director – Mano Murthy

Chennai Film Fans Association Awards
 Best Film
 Best Music Direction – Mano Murthy
 Best Supporting Artiste – Anant Nag

References

2003 films
2000s Kannada-language films
Films scored by Mano Murthy
Best Kannada Feature Film National Film Award winners
Films directed by Kavitha Lankesh